KAH may refer to:

 Kah
 Kimberly Ann Hart